Isoetes taiwanensis is a species of plant in the family Isoetaceae. It is endemic to Taiwan, and the only species of quillwort there. It grows submersed in shallow ponds for most of the year. IUCN considers it critically endangered because of habitat loss.

The first quillwort genome sequence was of I. taiwanensis. This showed that there were differences in its biochemistry from terrestrial plants that had adopted the same strategy for CO2 fixation, namely Crassulacean acid metabolism (CAM). This involves the enzyme phosphoenolpyruvate carboxylase (PEPC) and plants have two forms of the enzyme. One is normally involved in CO2 fixation during photosynthesis and the other in central metabolism. From the genome sequence, it appears that in I. taiwanensis both forms are involved in photosynthesis. In addition, the time of day of the peak abundance of some of the components of CAM was different from terrestrial plants. These fundamental differences in biochemistry suggests that CAM in I. taiwanensis, and likely all quillworts, is another example of convergent evolution of CAM.

References

taiwanensis
Endemic flora of Taiwan
Critically endangered plants
Taxonomy articles created by Polbot
Plants described in 1972